With Love from Our Friends is the tenth studio album by American R&B group Full Force, released on August 22, 2014 through Full Force Productions, a license to Sony Music Entertainment.

Track listing

References

External links
 

2014 albums
Full Force albums
Albums produced by Full Force